Wotkyns Glacier is a glacier flowing north from Michigan Plateau along the west side of Caloplaca Hills to enter the Reedy Glacier. Mapped by United States Geological Survey (USGS) from surveys and U.S. Navy air photos, 1960–64. Named by Advisory Committee on Antarctic Names (US-ACAN) for Grosvenor S. Wotkyns, hospital corpsman at Byrd Station in 1962.

References

Glaciers of Marie Byrd Land